Fabian Kiessling (born 16 August 1972) is a German radiologist, university lecturer and author as well as a scientist in the field of molecular imaging.

Academic career 
Fabian Kiessling was born Mannheim and graduated high school in 1992 in Heidelberg and studied medicine at Heidelberg University. After his elective period at the district hospital in Schwetzingen, he completed his studies with the second state examination and was awarded his doctorate in 2001 in Internal Medicine.

From 2001 he worked in the Dept. of Oncological Diagnostics and Therapy at the German Cancer Research Center (DKFZ) in Heidelberg and stayed there as an intern until 2002.

In 2003 he moved to the Dept. of Oncology at the Thorax Clinic Heidelberg and in parallel became head of the Molecular Diagnostics group in the Dept. of Medical Physics in Radiology at the DKFZ.
In 2006, he became the  Junior Group Leader for 'Molecular Imaging' at the DKFZ and habilitated in Experimental Radiology at the Heidelberg University.

2007 he completed his education as a medical specialist in diagnostic radiology.

In March 2008 he was appointed as full professor and director of the Institute for Experimental Molecular Imaging (ExMI) at RWTH Aachen (Rheinisch-Westfälische Technische Hochschule Aachen). He is also one of the directors of the RWTH Helmholtz Institute for Biomedical Engineering.

Boards and Chairs 

 2005-2012 - Speaker of the section Molecular Imaging of the working group Methodology and Research of the Deutsche Röntgengesellschaft
 2008-2012 - chairman of the abovementioned working group
 2012-onwards - Served in the council of European Society for Molecular Imaging (ESMI)
 2014-2015 - Chairman of the “Molecular Imaging Subcommittee” of the European Society of Radiology
 2016 - Program chair of the World Molecular Imaging Congress in New York 
 2018 - Member of the Board of Trustees of the World Molecular Imaging Society (WMIS)
 Current - WMIC Fellow
 Current - Member of the executive board of the Deutsche Gesellschaft für Biomedizinische Technik (German)
 Current - Vice president of the ESMI (European Society for Molecular Imaging)

Research 

The research of Fabian Kiessling focusses on the development of new imaging methods and probes, with a particular focus on oncology and diseases that go along with angiogenesis and vascular remodeling.  He worked on the  imaging technique volumetric area detector computed tomography and published the new ultrasound technique  Motion Model Ultrasound Localization Microscopy together with his colleague Georg Schmitz. The ultrasound technique was preclinically tested and used in a first clinical application. Both methods allow non-invasive imaging of hair-thin blood vessels in tumors and other tissues. In his translational research, imaging-guided therapy plays an important role including the investigation of biological barriers for drug delivery and the development of strategies to overcome these barriers by the use of nanomedicines, drug delivery systems, and other therapeutics.

Awards 

 2006 Dr. Emil Salzer Prize
 2006 Richtzenhain Prize

Honors 

 2020, he became a Fellow of the World Molecular Imaging Society (WMIS) [https://www.wmis.org/about-us/fellows/]
 2022, he became a Fellow of the RWTH Aachen University
 5th Master Level WingTsun and 1st Teacher Level Magic Hands of Kan-Ki-Fu as a student of Sifu Keith R. Kernspecht [German Wikipedia]

Selected publications

Books edited

Most-cited peer-reviewed journal articles 
 T Lammers, F Kiessling, WE Hennink, G Storm/ Drug targeting to tumors: Principles, pitfalls and (pre-) clinical progress. Journal of controlled release 161 (2), 175-187 (2012). 
T Lammers, S Aime, WE Hennink, G Storm, F Kiessling.  Theranostic Nanomedicine. Accounts of chemical research 44 (10), 1029-1038  (2011)

References

External links 
 
 Publications by Fabian Kiessling in PubMed
 Fabian Kießling on Google Scholar
 Webpage of the Chair of Experimental Molecular Imaging
 Lecturer overview of the DKFZ (PDF; 140  kB)
 Biography on the page of the book series Health Academy
 List of highly cited researchers 2021 on Web of Science
 List of highly cited researchers 2022 on Web of Science
 VDE podcast Signals for Life on ultrasound imaging

20th-century German physicians
German radiologists
Academic staff of RWTH Aachen University
1972 births
Living people
Physicians from Baden-Württemberg